Aaroh is an alternative rock band from Karachi, Sindh, Pakistan, formed in 1998. The band was founded by keyboardist Kamran Khan and lead guitarist Nabeel Nihal . (This name was given to them by Shoaib Mansoor), who were joined by, Vocalist Farooq Ahmed, Bassist Khalid Khan and Drummer Adnan Hussain.

The band achieved fame with their exuberant live performances backed up with thought provoking lyrics, and also, their performance in the Pakistani rock scene in 2002, most notably at the Pepsi Battles of the bands, helped them leave a trail for themselves. Soon, after the success of the battle of the bands, Hussain was replaced by drummer Jason Anthony and then the band went on releasing their critically acclaim debut album, Sawaal, in September 2003. Singles from the album like Sawaal, Na Kaho, Jalan and Jeeyay were a success and topped several local music charts. In 2004, band members, Ahmed and Chishty went into a dispute that who owns the rights for the band's name. This saw Chishty and Kamran Khan leaving as the band officially announced their split up. The band then recruited Haider Hashmi on lead guitars as a replacement for Chishty. Aaroh, with their new lead guitarist, then went on releasing their second studio album Raag Neela in 2006, receiving critical acclaim. Singles such as "Raag Neela", "Pyaar Ka Jaal" and "Janay Kyun" did well at the local music charts.

History

Formation (2002)
In early 2002, during this time Pepsi Battle of the Bands advertisement began to air on television; the competition called upon entries of aspiring bands from all over Pakistan. This saw the band taking participation in the competition by the name "Aaroh", given by Shoaib Mansoor. It was during this time Aaroh officially came into being. Aaroh band members got together for the Battle of the Bands and went to perform at the competition. The band first took part in the digital round of the competition, where the band went on head to head with twenty hundred bands from across the four provinces of Pakistan. The competition included bands like Entity Paradigm, Mekaal Hasan Band and Mizmaar, which also later on became well known popular mainstream rock bands coming from the underground music scene. During the competition, the band performed songs "Sawaal", "Aag Ki Tarhan" and also covering the Vital Signs song, "Ajnabi".

After a sixteen months hiatus, during which the competition was being aired on national, cable and satellite television programmes, viewers polled for their favourite band in the competition. By then the results of the Battle of the Bands came out and it was told that two bands who made to the finals were Aaroh along with Entity Paradigm. The band went on perform to compete at the finals of the competition held in Karachi, Sindh. The band won the competition by a narrow margin to Entity Paradigm, who came runner-ups, in front of an audience of around 4,000 at the NRA Golf Club, where the finals were held.

Success (2003–2005)
On 21 September 2003, the band went on releasing their debut album Sawaal, through the record label Sadaf Stereo all over Pakistan.

Shortly after the release of Sawaal, the lead-guitarist Nabeel Nihal Chishty and the keyboard player Kamran Khan did the title track for the 2004 Bollywood film Rakht using the band's label which led to band members Khalid Khan and Farooq Ahmed having dispute with Nabeel Nihal Chishty and Kamran Khan. Farooq Ahmed and Khalid Khan kept the Aaroh brand and were joined by Haider Hashmi on lead guitars and Jason Anthony and release the music video of Na Kaho which became their most popular song to date.

2006–2009
Aaroh released a few music videos from their new album Raag Neela. The full album was released in late 2006.

Aaroh disbanded in 2009 concentrating on their personal projects. Farooq Ahmed, vocalist and Haider Hashmi, lead guitarist, went on to pursue a career as solo musicians, while bassist Khalid Khan went on performing as a session player for the band Fuzön.

Farooq Ahmed moved to the United States in 2010, one year after Aaroh disbanding.

Return (2013–14)
With Farooq Ahmed living in the US, Haider Hashmi, Khalid Khan and Jason Anthony started thinking about reforming with a new vocalist Rizwan Anwar.

Aaroh released a new single Mera Pyar in 2013. There were plans on working on an album as well.

Haider Hashmi died in 2014 due to brain tumor which led to Aaroh disbanding and plans for the album being cancelled. In 2016 Nescafe Basement paid a tribute to the late guitarist in the seventh episode of the fourth season of the show.

Comeback (2017–present)
Pepsi Battle of the Bands was being resurrected in 2017 and Farooq Ahmed was asked to be a guest judge in the auditions round, which he accepted.

Aaroh confirmed its comeback while speaking to the Express Tribune. On August 1, 2017 Aaroh released a teaser of their new track titled Jeet Banjae Apna Nishaan which was released in February 2018 titled as Jeet and was a tribute to the Pakistan Super League. The band performed Raag Neela in the second episode of the second season of Pepsi Battle of the Bands featuring Kashan Admani of Mizmaar, officially marking their comeback and have been performing at different venues since then. The band also performed Na Kaho in the last episode of Pepsi Battle of the Bands.

In late 2017, Asad Ul Hafeez joined the band on lead guitars. Later on 3 December 2017, Aaroh in partnership with Patari released Mein Nahi Manta (Dastoor) a rendition of Habib Jalib's Dastoor accompanied with a music video. The song was released as a Patari exclusive on the streaming site and YouTube.

Awards and nominations
Aaroh's most significant achievement was winning the Pepsi Battle of the Bands in 2002. Aaroh has also been nominated at the ARY Asian/Bollywood Awards for the "Best Band" award in 2004 and received a nomination for the "Best Lyrics Award" for their song "Na Kaho" at the Indus Music Awards in 2005.

Discography
Studio albums
Sawaal (2003)
Raag Neela (2006)

Soundtracks
 Rakht (title track for the 2004 Bollywood film Rakht)

Singles
 Mera Pyar (2013)
 Mein Nahi Manta (Dastoor) (2017)
 Jeet (2018)

Music videos

Band members
Current line-up
Farooq Ahmed – Lead vocals (1998–2009) (2017–Present)
Jason Anthony – Drums (2003–2009) (2013-2014) (2017-Present)
Khalid Khan  – Bass guitar (1998–2009) (2013-2014) (2017-Present)
Asad Ul Hafeez  – Lead guitar (2017–Present)

Former members
Rizwan Anwar – Lead vocals (2013–2014)
Kamran "Kami Jee" Khan – Keyboards, Backing vocals (1998–2004)
Nabeel Nihal Chishty – Lead guitar, Backing vocals (1998–2004)
Adnan Hussain – Drums (1998–2002)
Haider Hashmi – Lead guitar, Rhythm guitar (2004–2009)(2013-2014)

Session musicians
Saeed Ahmad Mughal – Drums (2006)

Timeline
<div class="left">

See also 
 List of Pakistani music bands

References

Musical groups established in 1998
Musical quartets
Pakistani rock music groups
Musical groups from Karachi
1998 establishments in Pakistan
Articles which contain graphical timelines